Martyrius was Patriarch of Antioch from 460 to 470. A Chalcedonian, his patriarchate was dominated by strife between the Chalcedonians and Non-Chalcedonians.

Martyrius was deposed by prominent Non-Chalcedonian Peter the Fuller in 470, the latter supported by Zeno, a general and son-in-law of Byzantine Emperor Leo I. Martyrius fled to Constantinople, where he was supported by Patriarch Gennadius, whose influence with Leo secured Martyrius's brief restoration. However, Peter the Fuller soon forced out Martyrius again, himself occupying the patriarchate once more. Martyrius again appealed to Leo, who again deposed Peter the Fuller, this time in favor of a new Chalcedonian successor, Julian.

References

Sources 
 

Patriarchs of Antioch
5th-century Byzantine bishops
5th-century archbishops